The Wungong Tunnel links the Wungong Dam to Perth's Integrated Water Supply System.

It originates just west of Wungong Dam and runs through the granite Darling Scarp to the western portal in Rails Crescent, Wungong.

References

Darling Range
Tunnels completed in 1982
Tunnels in Western Australia
1982 establishments in Australia